The Madison County School District is a public school district based in Ridgeland, Mississippi (USA).

In addition to Ridgeland, the district serves the cities of Flora and Madison, a small portion of Jackson that lies in Madison County, the community of Camden, and most rural areas in Madison County. Kearney Park and most of Gluckstadt is in this district.

Schools

Camden, MS School Zone
Velma Jackson High School (Grades 9-12)
Shirley Simmons Middle School (Grades 6-8)
Luther Branson Elementary School (Grades K-5)
Camden Elementary School (Grades K-5)

Ridgeland, MS School Zone
Ridgeland High School (Grades 9-12)
Olde Towne Middle School (Grades 6-8)
Highland Elementary School (Grades 3-5)
Ann Smith Elementary School (Grades K-2)

Gluckstadt, MS School Zone
Germantown High School (Grades 9-12)
Germantown Middle School (Grades 6-8)
Madison Crossing Elementary School (Grades K-5)
Mannsdale Upper Elementary School (Grades 3-5)
Mannsdale Elementary School (Grades K-2)

Madison-Flora, MS School Zone
Madison Central High School (Grades 10-12)
Rosa Scott High High School (Grades 9)
Madison Middle School (Grades 6-8)
Madison Station Elementary School (Grades K-5)
East Flora Elementary School (Grades K-5)
Madison Avenue Upper Elementary School (Grades 3-5)
Madison Avenue Elementary School (Grades K-2)

Alternative School
Academic Options Center (Grades K-12)

Former Schools

East Flora High School
Madison-Ridgeland High School
Madison Station Elementary School (Original)
Scott High School
East Flora Middle School

Demographics
In 2017 39% of the students were black. That year, under Mississippi school accountability rankings, the school received an "A".

2018-19 school year
There were more than 13,000 students enrolled in the Madison County School District during the 2018–2019 school year. The gender makeup of the district was 49% female and 51% male. The racial makeup of the district was 38.40% African American, 57.45% White, 1.51% Hispanic, 2.56% Asian, and 0.08% Native American. 25.4% of the district's students were eligible to receive free lunch.

Accountability statistics

References

External links
 

Education in Madison County, Mississippi
School districts in Mississippi
School districts in the Jackson metropolitan area, Mississippi
Education in Jackson, Mississippi